The Festningen Sandstone is an Early Cretaceous (Barremian) geologic formation in Svalbard, in the far north of Norway. Fossil ornithopod tracks have been reported from the formation.

See also 
 List of dinosaur-bearing rock formations
 List of stratigraphic units with ornithischian tracks
 Ornithopod tracks
 List of fossiliferous stratigraphic units in Norway
 Lunde Formation
 Camarillas Formation
 South Polar region of the Cretaceous

References

Bibliography

Further reading 
 J. H. Hurum, J. Milàn, Hammer Midtkandal, H. Amundsen, and B. Sæther. 2006. Tracking polar dinosaurs—new finds from the Lower Cretaceous of Svalbard. Norwegian Journal of Geology 86:397-402
 A. F. d. Lapparent. 1960. Découverte de traces de pas de Dinosauriens dans le Crétacé du Spitzberg [Discovery of dinosaur footprints in the Cretaceous of Siptzbergen]. Comptes Rendus de l'Académie des Sciences à Paris 251:1399-1400

Geologic formations of Norway
Geology of Svalbard
Lower Cretaceous Series of Europe
Cretaceous Norway
Barremian Stage
Sandstone formations
Ichnofossiliferous formations
Paleontology in Norway